Medine Sara Borita Gille formerly Seppälä (born 8 September 1981) is a Swedish politician and a member of the Riksdag for Sweden Democrats party.

Biography
Gille was born in Sweden, her mother is Swedish while her father is Kurdish, but she was mostly raised in foster care. She graduated with a degree in medicine and worked as a nurse in a hospital and an assisted living facility. 

She has been active in politics since 2014. She has described honour violence and forced marriages as issues which inspired her to take an interest in becoming a politician, having relatives who were subjected to both and has called for both practices to be outlawed in Sweden. 

During the 2018 Swedish general election, she was elected to the Riksdag for the seat of Malmö Municipality. In parliament, she has served on the Committee on Foreign Affairs and Committee on Education. She was reelected during the 2022 Swedish general election but for the Dalarna county constituency. She took parental leave after her election and was replaced by Rasmus Giertz as a member of parliament.

Outside of politics she lives in Dorotea with her family and cites skiing and riding snowmobiles as her main interests.

References 

1981 births
Living people
Members of the Riksdag from the Sweden Democrats
Swedish people of Kurdish descent
Swedish politicians of Kurdish descent
Kurdish politicians
People from Haninge Municipality
People from Dorotea Municipality
Women members of the Riksdag
Members of the Riksdag 2018–2022
Members of the Riksdag 2022–2026
21st-century Swedish women politicians
21st-century Kurdish women politicians